The Imperial Liberal Party was a political party in Germany during the 1870s.

History
The party contested the first elections in the newly unified Germany in 1871, winning 30 seats. The 1874 elections saw the party's vote share fall from 7% to just 1% as it won only three seats. The party did not contest any further elections.

References

Defunct political parties in Germany
National liberal parties
Liberal parties in Germany
Conservative parties in Germany